Richard Simmons (born 1948) is an American fitness personality and actor.

Richard Simmons may also refer to:
 Richard Simmons (actor) (1913–2003), American actor
 Richard Simmons (cricketer) (1737–1802), English cricketer
 Richard Alan Simmons, Canadian-American screenwriter
 Rich Simmons, British pop artist

See also
Richard Symonds (disambiguation)
Simmons (surname)